At the 1995 Summer Universiade, the athletics events were held at the Hakatanomori Athletic Stadium in Fukuoka, Japan from 29 August to 3 September. A total of 43 events were contested, of which 23 by male and 20 by female athletes.

The medal table ended closely, with the United States, Russia and host nation Japan each winning five gold medals. The United States had the highest number of silver medals (six) while Russia had the largest medal haul with sixteen medals in total. Romania managed four gold medals, all of them in the women's competition, while Italy had the third greatest number of medals with ten. Thirty-six nations reached the medal table in the athletics competition. The gold medals won by sprinter Eswort Coombs from Saint Vincent and the Grenadines and hurdler Nicole Ramalalanirina of Madagascar were their countries' only medals at the 1995 Universiade.

Two Universiade records were broken at the competition: the United States men's 4×400 metres relay team ran a time of 3:00.40 minutes and Italy's Annarita Sidoti set a new 10 km walk record. Furthermore, Šárka Kašpárková equalled the women's triple jump standard. Romania's Gabriela Szabo took two gold medals – winning the 1500 metres and 5000 metres – beginning an international career which would see her win three world titles and an Olympic gold. Future Olympic sprint medallists Obadele Thompson and Ekaterini Thanou were runners-up in the 100 metres races.

Abdelkader Chékhémani, Iulia Negură and Heike Meissner all defended their respective 1993 titles, while Hungary's István Bagyula took his third consecutive pole vault gold medal. Men's hammer throw winner Balázs Kiss went on to win the Olympic title in 1996 and the women's discus throw champion Natalya Sadova was the Olympic silver medallist that same year. The 1990 European champion Dragutin Topić was the winner of the men's high jump.

In the event programme, the women's 3000 metres was replaced by the 5000 metres for the first time, matching the IAAF's changes at the 1995 World Championships in Athletics earlier that August. The 1995 competition featured the last Universiade marathon races, as the distance was replaced by the shorter half marathon event at future editions.

Medal summary

Men

Women

Medal table

Participating nations

References

World Student Games (Universiade - Men) - GBR Athletics
World Student Games (Universiade - Women) - GBR Athletics
Athletics results from official site

External links
Official website

 
1995
Universiade
1995 Summer Universiade
International athletics competitions hosted by Japan